Roderick Albert Lewis (born June 9, 1971) is a former American football tight end who played four seasons with the Houston/Tennessee Oilers of the National Football League. He was drafted by the Houston Oilers in the fifth round of the 1994 NFL Draft. He played college football at the University of Arizona and attended Bishop Dunne Catholic School in Dallas, Texas.

References

External links
Just Sports Stats

Living people
1971 births
Players of American football from Washington, D.C.
American football tight ends
African-American players of American football
Arizona Wildcats football players
Houston Oilers players
Tennessee Oilers players
21st-century African-American sportspeople
20th-century African-American sportspeople